Christian Heinrich Nebbien, also known as Heinrich Nebbien or Henrik Nebbien, (1778–1841) was a German-born landscape architect, mainly active in Hungary.

His most important project was the Városliget park at the end of Andrássy Avenue in Budapest (1817).

Other projects for which he is known are:

 the park of the Betlér / Betliar mansion in Hungary, now Slovakia (1783–1795)
 the park of the Alsókorompa / Dolná Krupá mansion in Hungary, now Slovakia (1813–1819);
 The park in Martonvásár, Hungary.
 The park of Soborsin Castle, Soborsin /Săvârșin, Arad, Hungary, now Romania

He also wrote a book on the methods of increasing agricultural output, published in Prague in 1835.

Works
 Wie vielmal wohlfeiler kann der Landwirth produziren? Und: Wie vielmal größer kann der Ertrag des Bodens werden? –  Prag, J. G. Calve, 1835.

References

 Rosengräfin Marie Henriette Gräfin Chotek (24.11.1863 – 13.2.1946) 
 Jana Šulcová – Drei Kapitel aus der Baugeschichte des Schlosses Dolná Krupá 
 Prírodný park kaštieľa Betliar 
 Örsi Károly – Történeti kertek A magyar kertépítészet legszebb alkotásai 
 Biographisches Lexikon für Schleswig-Holstein und Lübeck 
 Neue Deutsche Biographie. Band 19 
 A Városliget Színházai 
 Magyar Erzsébet – Kertek, parkok Buda-Pest társaséletében a 19. században 
 Mittel-Transdanubien 
 Magyar kertművészet az újkorban 
 Nebbien Henrik (19. sz.) – Magyar Életrajzi Lexikon 1000–1990 

1778 births
1841 deaths
German landscape architects